Bahadur Singh Koli  is a member of Lok Sabha elected in 2014 from Bharatpur. He is also former member of Rajasthan Legislative Assembly elected in 2013 from Weir. and former member of Lok Sabha elected in 1999 from Bayana in Rajasthan as a candidate of Bharatiya Janata Party. He was born in 1961 in Bharatpur district. He was found beating a toll plaza security guard with his men on 11 July 2016, The video recording show him slapping the toll plaza employee in presence of police personals.

References

India MPs 1999–2004
People from Bharatpur district
India MPs 2014–2019
1961 births
Living people
Lok Sabha members from Rajasthan
Rajasthan MLAs 2013–2018
Bharatiya Janata Party politicians from Rajasthan